Tequila Sunrise may refer to:
 Tequila sunrise (cocktail), an alcoholic mixed drink
 Tequila Sunrise (film), a 1988 film
 "Tequila Sunrise" (song), a 1973 song by the Eagles
 "Tequila Sunrise", a 1998 song by Cypress Hill from Cypress Hill IV
 "Tequila Sunrise", a 2019 song by Jackson Wang and Higher Brothers from Head in the Clouds II
 "Tequila Sunrise", a 1976 song and 2002 album by Annie Whittle
 Tequila sunrise, a uniform worn by the Houston Astros

See also
Tequila (disambiguation)
Sunrise (disambiguation)
 To Kill a Sunrise, 2021 album by Kota the Friend feat. Statik Selektah

fr:Tequila (homonymie)